Greek Cooking is an album by American saxophonist Phil Woods featuring performances recorded in 1967 for the Impulse! label.

Reception
The Allmusic review by Ken Dryden awarded the album 3 stars stating "Probably one of the more unusual recordings in Phil Woods' considerable discography, Greek Cooking features the alto saxophonist leading a tentet with a distinctly Greek flavor, including four Greek musicians... it should appeal to Woods' fans because of his ability to make the best of the material with his powerful, never dull playing".

Track listing
All compositions by Norman Gold except where noted.
 "Zorba the Greek" (Mikis Theodorakis) - 3:08   
 "A Taste of Honey" (Bobby Scott, Ric Marlow) - 6:00   
 "Theme from Anthony & Cleopatra" (Alex North) - 4:52   
 "Got a Feelin'" (Denny Doherty, John Phillips) - 4:30   
 "Theme from Samson & Delilah" (Victor Young) - 5:15   
 "Greek Cooking" - 5:00   
 "Nica" - 5:39

Recorded in New York City on January 31 (tracks 2, 4 & 5), and February 1 (tracks 1, 3, 6 & 8), 1967

Personnel
Phil Woods - alto saxophone
William Costa - accordion, marimba
George Mgrdichian - oud
Stuart Scharf - guitar
Chet Amsterdam - electric bass
Bill LaVorgna - drums
Souren Baronian - drums, cymbals
Seymour Salzberg - percussion
Iordanis Tsomidis - bouzouki
John Yalenezian - dumbeg
Norman Gold - arranger

References

Impulse! Records albums
Phil Woods albums
1967 albums
Albums produced by Bob Thiele